Chinnapasupula is a small village of Peddamudium Block of Kadapa district in Andhra Pradesh, India. The village consists of nearly 500 people in population, of which about 370 are voters. The most common native language of Chinnapasupula is Telugu.

Education
So many well educated students are there in the village. In the village one MPP school is there to give education to poor students.

References

Villages in Kadapa district